The Historia Regum ("History of the Kings") is a historical compilation attributed to Symeon of Durham, which presents material going from the death of Bede until 1129. It survives only in one manuscript compiled in Yorkshire in the mid-to-late 12th century, though the material is earlier. It is an often-used source for medieval English and Northumbrian history. The first five sections are now attributed to Byrhtferth of Ramsey.

Sources
It is a "historical compilation" or a "historical collection" rather than a chronicle or anything else.  Antonia Gransden and David Rollason list its sources as follows:

Much of the compiled material up until 887, i.e. the first five sections, was itself probably derived from an earlier compilation by Byrhtferth of Ramsey, and probably some of it was compiled before the end of the 10th century. The material covering 1119–1129 does appear to be original, and this part may have been authored by Symeon.

Manuscripts and authorship
The full text survives in one manuscript, Cambridge, Corpus Christi College, MS 139, at folios 51v–129v, written down in the late 12th century. An abbreviated copy is also found in Paris, Bibliothèque nationale de France, MS nouv. acq. lat. 692. Even though the Cambridge manuscript names Symeon as the author in an incipit and an explicit, Symeon's authorship of the work is often doubted by modern historians. Besides not being an original historical work, reasons of internal evidence make it highly unlikely that the Historia Regum was written by the same author as the Libellus de exordio, which is generally accepted to have been authored by Symeon.

Notes

Editions
 
 Stevenson, Joseph (tr.). Church Historians of England. 8 vols: vol. 3 (part 2: The Historical Works of Simeon of Durham). London, 1853. 425-617. Google Books.
 Arnold, Thomas (ed.). Symeonis Monachi Opera Omnia. 2 vols: vol 2. London, 1885. 1-283. 
 Hart, Cyril R. (ed. and tr.). Byrhtferth’s Northumbrian Chronicle: An Edition and Translation of the Old English and Latin Annals. The Early Chronicles of England 2. Edwin Mellen Press, 2006. Edition and translation of the first five sections.

References

Further reading
  Reprinted in Studies in Medieval History presented to R. H. C. Davis, ed. Henry Mayr-Harting and R. I. Moore. London: Hambledon Press, 1985. 317 ff. 
 

Latin historical texts from Norman and Angevin Durham
12th-century Latin books